UFC 135: Jones vs. Rampage was a mixed martial arts event held by the Ultimate Fighting Championship on September 24, 2011 at the Pepsi Center in Denver, Colorado.

Background
The Ultimate Fighting Championship had its first ever event in Denver nearly 20 years prior to UFC 135, but the promotion has not operated a pay-per-view event in the Mile High City since The Ultimate Ultimate in 1995. Zuffa, the UFC's parent company, was not the owner back then. UFC president Dana White, in an interview with MMAWeekly.com, says that the company has long been on a course to return to Denver, but they wanted to do it the right way. “We knew that we wanted to bring a big exciting card back to Denver, and we finally got it done.”

Jon Jones was expected to make his first title defense on August 6, 2011 at UFC 133 against Rashad Evans, but Jones was sidelined with a hand injury.  It was initially announced that the hand injury would require surgery, but Jones opted for rest and rehabilitation without surgery after further consultations with doctors.  Jones' injury was originally thought to keep him out of action until late 2011, but instead, he made his first title defense against Quinton Jackson at this event.

UFC 135 featured two preliminary fights live on Spike TV.

Manny Gamburyan was scheduled to face Diego Nunes.  However, on August 15, it was announced Gamburyan had to pull out of the bout due to a shoulder injury. Then, on August 29, Nunes confirmed his own exit from the card, citing injury and a murder attempt on his father. The fight was later rescheduled for UFC 141, where Nunes won via unanimous decision.

A bout between Norifumi Yamamoto and Damacio Page was expected for this event.  However, the bout was scrapped on September 1 after both fighters sustained injuries while training for the bout.

Diego Sanchez was expected to face Matt Hughes, but was forced out of the bout with a broken hand and replaced by Josh Koscheck. After this fight Matt Hughes was offered a non competitive role in the UFC which resulted in his retirement from MMA.

Results

Bonus awards
Fighters were awarded $75,000 bonuses.

 Fight of the Night: Jon Jones vs. Quinton Jackson
 Knockout of the Night: Josh Koscheck
 Submission of the Night: Nate Diaz

References

External links
 

Ultimate Fighting Championship events
2011 in mixed martial arts
Mixed martial arts in Colorado
Sports competitions in Denver
2011 in Colorado
Events in Denver